International Day of Sign Languages (IDSL) is celebrated annually across the world on 23 September every year along with International Week of the Deaf.

The choice of 23 September is the same date that the World Federation of the Deaf was established in 1951.

Themes 

 2018: With sign language, everyone is included!
 2019: Sign language rights for all!
2020: Sign languages are for everyone!
 2021: We sign for human rights!
 2022: Sign languages unite us!

References

Sign language
Deaf culture
United Nations language days
September observances
Disability observances